Flaviflexus salsibiostraticola is a Gram-positive, non-spore-forming, aerobic, cocci-shaped and non-motile bacterium from the genus of Flaviflexus which has been isolated from a biofilm reactor from Korea.

References

Actinomycetales
Bacteria described in 2014